The 1979–80 SM-liiga season was the fifth season of the SM-liiga, the top level of ice hockey in Finland. 10 teams participated in the league, and HIFK Helsinki won the championship.

Standings

Playoffs

Semifinal
 TPS - Ässät 1:3 (6:1, 3:6, 3:4 P, 2:9)
 HIFK - Kärpät 3:1 (4:3 P, 1:3, 6:3, 4:2)

3rd place
 TPS - Kärpät 0:2 (2:12, 7:8)

Final
 HIFK - Ässät 3:0 (7:5, 4:2, 6:5)

Relegation

External links
 SM-liiga official website

1979–80 in Finnish ice hockey
Fin
Liiga seasons